Cristina Boiţ (born 14 May 1968 in Bucharest) is a retired discus thrower from Romania. She set her personal best (64.58 metres) in the women's discus throw event in 1988. Boiţ competed for her native country at two Summer Olympics: 1992 and 1996.

Achievements

References

sports-reference

1968 births
Living people
Romanian female discus throwers
Athletes (track and field) at the 1992 Summer Olympics
Athletes (track and field) at the 1996 Summer Olympics
Olympic athletes of Romania
Sportspeople from Bucharest